Abia State University Uturu (ABSU) is a Nigerian public university. It is one of the state owned universities in Nigeria. These state academic institutions were created to expand admissions and bring professional skills, expertise and modern research facilities close to the city and rural dwellers, and have helped talented students to obtain higher education.

The inception of the university was in 1981 in the former Imo State under the name of Imo State University, Etiti. The university was established by Sam Mbakwe when he was governor of old Imo State. The main campus was located at Etiti, Imo State, while the Law Department was located in a separate Campus at Aba. Between 1984 and 1985 under the military governorship of General Ike Nwachukwu, the university moved to its permanent site at Uturu Okigwe.

Following the creation of Abia State in 1991, the Uturu campus of the university was ceded to Abia State, and is now known as Abia State University Uturu, Isuikwuato Local Government Area, Abia State, Nigeria. The university is organized in colleges and schools having been founded on the same collegiate system that University of Nebraska operates.

Studies at Abia State University include: undergraduate, graduate and doctorate degrees. It has two campuses- its main campus in Uturu; and the College of Law, College of Agriculture and Veterinary Medicine housed by the campus in Umuahia, capital of Abia State, Nigeria.

Academics 

Abia State University offers more than 90 undergraduate and graduate programs across ten colleges.

 College of Humanities and Social Sciences 
 College of Agriculture and Veterinary Medicine 
 College of Biological and Physical Sciences 
 College of Business Administration  
 College of Education  
 College of Engineering and Environmental Studies 
 College of Law  
 College of Medicine and Health Sciences 
 College of Optometry  
 College of Postgraduate Studies

Centres, directorates and institutes 
The following are centres, directorates and Institutes within Abia State University;
 Centre For Entrepreneurial Education 
 Student Affairs Department 
 Counseling Centre  
 Centre for Primary and Non-Formal Education  
 General Studies  
 Centre for Igbo Studies  
 Academic Planning  
 SIWES  
 Sandwich Programme  
 Centre for Remedial Studies 
 University Examination Centre 
 Business Resource Centre  
 
 Institute for Distance Education (IDEA)  
 Institute for Computer Studies  
 Consultancies, Linkages & Revenue Mobilization  
 Institute of Arts & Sciences 
 Centre for Quality Assurance

Notes

References 

 Emmanuel, Korieocha. Imo State: A pictogram of Leadership Mongolism 2009 
 The Association of Commonwealth Universities. Abia State University Uturu, Nigeria

See also
Academic libraries in Nigeria

External links 

 ABSU website 
 WHED: World Higher Education Database: Collaboration with UNESCO and IAU: International Association of Universities: Abia State University 
 Abia State University: Association of Commonwealth Universities Listing 
 National Universities Commission

 
Universities and colleges in Nigeria
Education in Abia State
Educational institutions established in 1981
1981 establishments in Nigeria
Public universities in Nigeria
Academic libraries in Nigeria